Lord Hammond may refer to:
Edmund Hammond, 1st Baron Hammond of Kirkella  (1802–1890), Permanent Under-Secretary of State for Foreign Affairs 1854–1873
Philip Hammond, Baron Hammond of Runnymede (born 1955), British Conservative politician, Foreign Secretary 2014–2016 and Chancellor of the Exchequer 2016–2019